The Vărșag is a left tributary of the river Târnava Mare, in Romania. It flows into the Târnava Mare near the village Poiana Târnavei.

References

Rivers of Romania
Rivers of Harghita County